WWE (formerly the WWF, the WWWF, and Capitol Wrestling) has maintained at least one primary tag team championship for its male performers since 1958 (except for a two year interim between 1967 and 1969). During periods of brand division, separate tag team titles have been used on each brand.

For their female performers, a tag team championship existed from 1983 to 1989. The title was abandoned in 1989 due to lack of depth in the division. In 2019, WWE introduced a new women's tag team championship, shared by Raw and SmackDown, followed by one for the NXT brand in 2021.

Overview of titles

Male

Female

History

Male

Capitol Wrestling set up its first tag team championship, the NWA United States Tag Team Championship in 1958.  When Capitol seceded from the National Wrestling Alliance in 1963 and became the World Wide Wrestling Federation (WWWF), the championship became the WWWF United States Tag Team Championship. In 1967, WWWF World Heavyweight Champion Bruno Sammartino teamed with Spiros Arion to win the belts. Due to Sammartino being the world champion, the team vacated the tag titles which were then abandoned.

For two years, the WWWF had no tag team championship until The Rising Suns (Toru Tanaka and Mitsu Arakawa) arrived in the promotion in September 1969 with the WWWF International Tag Team Championship which they claimed to have won in a tournament in Tokyo in June of that year. This became the WWWF's tag team title until 1971, mostly being held by The Mongols. When they left the WWWF, taking the titles with them, the promotion established their own original world tag team championship, the WWWF World Tag Team Championship. In 1979, the promotion became the World Wrestling Federation (WWF) and the tag titles were renamed the WWF Tag Team Championship until 1983 when they became the WWF World Tag Team Championship. 

In May 1985, Tatsumi Fujinami and Kengo Kimura beat Dick Murdoch and Adrian Adonis in a tournament final in Japan for a revival of the old International Tag Team Title of 1969–1971, only for the title to be abandoned again when New Japan and the WWF fell out in October 1985. By 1988, wrestling magazine Pro Wrestling Illustrated was calling for  the establishment of a secondary WWF Intercontinental Tag Team Championship (modelled on the WCW United States Tag Team Championship) due to the glut of tag team competition in the promotion. This never took place, but in 1991, WWF-affiliated promotion UWF Japan introduced the WWF Intercontinental Tag Team Championship, claimed by the team of Perro Aguayo and Gran Hamada. This title was abandoned when the affiliation ended later that same year.  

In 2001, the WWF bought rival company World Championship Wrestling (WCW), acquiring the WCW World Tag Team Championship, among other titles, which was defended on WWF programming until that year's Survivor Series, where the WCW World Tag Team Championship was unified into the WWF World Tag Team Championship.

After WWF's initial brand extension in the spring of 2002 and the renaming of the company as World Wrestling Entertainment (WWE), the tag titles became the WWE Tag Team Championship and champions Billy and Chuck were drafted to the SmackDown brand. That summer, however, The Un-Americans (Christian and Lance Storm) would win the championship and shortly thereafter transfer it to the Raw brand where it was later renamed the World Tag Team Championship, effectively leaving the SmackDown brand without a tag team title. As a result, then-SmackDown general manager Stephanie McMahon introduced a new WWE Tag Team Championship and commissioned it to be the tag team title for the SmackDown brand.

			
The two titles were unified in 2009 and were collectively referred to as the "Unified WWE Tag Team Championship" while officially remaining independently active until the World Tag Team Championship was formally decommissioned in 2010, leaving the newer title as WWE's only tag team championship. As a result of the 2016 draft, the championship became exclusive to Raw and was renamed the Raw Tag Team Championship, and SmackDown created the SmackDown Tag Team Championship as a counterpart title. In addition, WWE's former developmental territory NXT established the NXT Tag Team Championship in January 2013, which became one of WWE's main titles for male tag teams in September 2019 when NXT became recognized as WWE's third major brand. Another title, the NXT UK Tag Team Championship, debuted for NXT's sister brand NXT UK in 2019, but is recognized as being a step below the other three. The Raw, SmackDown, NXT, and NXT UK tag team titles are WWE's currently active tag team championships for its male performers.

Female
Prior to 1983, the WWF did not have a tag team championship for their women's division. In 1983, the reigning NWA Women's World Tag Team Champions of Velvet McIntyre and Princess Victoria joined the WWF. As the WWF had withdrawn from the NWA, which owned the championship, McIntyre and Victoria were recognized as the first WWF Women's Tag Team Champions. The championship continued until 1989, when the promotion abandoned it due to lack of performers in the division. The Glamour Girls (Leilani Kai and Judy Martin) were the final champions.

The promotion would go without a women's tag team championship for many years. Talk of reviving the titles began circulating in 2012, when a WWE.com article was posted in favor of resurrecting the titles. Female performers were also in favor of adding a women's tag team championship. Online speculation began when WWE announced their first all female event, Evolution, for October, but the titles did not appear. On the December 24 episode of Monday Night Raw, WWE Chairman Vince McMahon officially announced that a new WWE Women's Tag Team Championship would debut in 2019 (and would not carry the lineage of the original title). The Boss 'n' Hug Connection (Bayley and Sasha Banks) became the inaugural champions at Elimination Chamber in February. It was also revealed that the titles would be defended across Raw, SmackDown, and NXT.

The WWE Women's Tag Team Championship would continue to be defended on NXT until March 2021. On the March 10, 2021 episode of NXT, NXT General Manager William Regal established the NXT Women's Tag Team Championship, naming Dakota Kai and Raquel González as the first champions, due to the controversial ending of their match for the WWE Women's Tag Team Championship the week prior and their having won the first Women's Dusty Rhodes Tag Team Classic. The WWE Women's Tag Team Championship subsequently ceased being available to NXT.

Longest championship reigns

Male

Top 10 tag team championship reigns
The following list shows the top 10 tag team championship reigns in WWE history.

Specific record for each championship
The following list shows the longest reigning champion for each tag team championship created and/or promoted by WWE, with the exception of the WWF Intercontinental Tag Team Championship. The team of Perro Aguayo and Gran Hamada won the inaugural championship on January 7, 1991. The title was abandoned at an unknown date, without ever being lost to another team. The length of their reign can thus not be determined.

Titles are listed in order of creation.

Female

Top 10 tag team championship reigns
The following list shows the top 10 tag team championship reigns in WWE history.

Specific record for each championship
The following list shows the longest reigning champion for each tag team championship created and/or promoted by WWE.

Titles are listed in order of creation.

Most championship reigns

Male
The following lists shows the wrestlers with the most reigns for each tag team championship created and/or promoted by WWE.

By team

By wrestler

Female
The following lists shows the wrestlers with the most reigns for each tag team championship created and/or promoted by WWE.

By team

By wrestler

Most total reigns 
The following list shows the wrestlers who have the most tag team championship reigns in total as individuals, combining all titles they have held as recognized by WWE. This list also shows the titles that they won to achieve this record.

Inaugural WWE Tag Team Championship holders 
The following list shows the inaugural Male and Female WWE Tag Team Championship belt holders and the years that they were first ever won in WWE history.

Male

Female

See also 

 World championships in WWE
 Women's championships in WWE

References

 
Tag team wrestling championships